Shane Dennis (born July 3, 1971) is a former professional baseball player. He played in the San Diego Padres organization and in JapanPacific League for the  Chiba Lotte Marines in 1997 and 1998.  He played at and served as a director of operations for the Wichita State University baseball team.

References

Chiba Lotte Marines players
Wichita State Shockers baseball players
Wichita State University faculty
Living people
1971 births
All-American college baseball players
Springfield Sultans players
Spokane Indians players
Clinton LumberKings players
Rancho Cucamonga Quakes players
Memphis Chicks players
Las Vegas Stars (baseball) players